Phaedon concinnus is a species of leaf beetle in the genus Phaedon. 
It is associated with Plantago maritima and Triglochin maritimum

Description
Phaedon concinnus adult beetles measure 3.2–4.1 mm in length. They are bright metallic green to greenish-blue in colour, occasionally coppery.

References

Beetles described in 1831
Chrysomelinae